Redmill may refer to:

Robert Redmill (c. 1765 – 1819), British naval officer
, more than one ship of the British Royal Navy

See also
Red Mill (disambiguation)